FabricLive.62 is a 2012 DJ mix album by Kasra. The album was released as part of the FabricLive Mix Series.

Track list

References

External links
Fabric: FabricLive.62

Fabric (club) albums
2012 compilation albums